The ISU Junior World Challenge Cup is an international synchronized skating competition that determines the best junior teams in the world. Held for the first time in 2001, the competition is sanctioned by International Skating Union. From 2013 to 2016, the event was held biennially in even-numbered years, after the 2013 launch of the World Junior Championships which was to be held in odd-numbered years.  However, because the World Junior Championships has been held annually since 2017, there has not been any ISU Junior World Challenge Cup after 2016.

Medalists

References

'juniorb